The Dayangzhou Chengjia site is an archaeological site located on the Gan River in Dayangzhou Town, Xingan County, Jiangxi, China. The site was excavated in 1989, and it dates to around 1200 BCE. The rich offerings of bronze and jade objects made it the second richest burial site known after the Fu Hao's tomb.

Dayangzhou was home to a rectangular tomb covered by a tumulus. Largely damaged by the sand shifts, it did not preserve the skeletal remains of coffin, making some archaeologists doubt that the find was a tomb at all.

Over 1,000 jade artefacts were discovered at Dayangzhou.

Dayangzhou is known for its unique style of bronze vessels, with 54 being discovered; over 480 bronze objects were uncovered at the site. The bronze casters at Dayangzhou copied and mastered the techniques of the Erligang culture, then localized the bronze vessels in a distinct style. Dayangzhou is associated with the Wucheng culture.

The artefacts from Dayangzhou are housed primarily in the Jiangxi Provincial Museum.

Gallery

See also
 Panlongcheng
 Sanxingdui

References
 Allan, Sarah (ed), The Formation of Chinese Civilization: An Archaeological Perspective, 
 The Cambridge History of Ancient China : From the Origins of Civilization to 221 BC, Edited by Michael Loewe and Edward L. Shaughnessy.  
Zhang Liangren, Wucheng and Shang: A New History of a Bronze Age Civilization in Southern China. Bulletin of the Museum of Far Eastern Antiquities 78 (2010), 53–78

Archaeological sites in China
Bronze Age in China
History of Jiangxi
Buildings and structures in Jiangxi
1989 archaeological discoveries
12th-century BC establishments in China